Dejan Udovičić (born 26 July 1970) is a Serbian professional water polo head coach. He was named head coach for Serbia in June 2006, after the dissolution of the state union of Serbia and Montenegro. As a senior, he played for Partizan Belgrade and VK Beograd, while his coaching career started with Partizan where he stayed for nine seasons (2000-2009). His most notable achievement with the club was third place at the 2007 Euroleague Final Four in Milan. As the head coach of the Serbian national team, he has won gold medals at the 2009 World Aquatics Championships and the 2006 Men's European Water Polo Championship, as well as the 2012 Men's European Water Polo Championship. He has also steered the national team to a bronze medal at the 2008 Olympics in Beijing.

Early life
Dejan and his twin brother Darko began playing water polo in primary school, after a friend of their father's recommended they tried it out. Both were attracted to other sports as well, but in the end decided to stick with water polo. At that time, Partizan had top level coaches who had emerged from the famous Yugoslav water polo school headed by Bata Vlaho Orlić (1934-2010). One of the top experts was Nikola Stamenić, who saw, early on, Dejan's potential as a player and even as a future coach. Dejan went on to play for Partizan with great success and became a member of the national team which he then captained for almost 15 years. On the other hand, Darko became the record holder for most games played in of the most successful national water polo teams of all time. While Darko ended his career as a player, Dejan decided to try himself as a coach.

Club career as a coach

VK Partizan (2000–2009)
Udovičić left the club on April 23, 2009, after his team's defeat against Jug in the Euroleague quarterfinals, which meant the Serbian champions failed to qualify for the Final Four.

Career as a Serbian national team coach

2012 Olympic Games in London
At the first training session before the 2012 European Championship, Udovičić showed his players an image of the golden medals which were to be awarded to the winners of the Olympic tournament in London. He told his players, When you start feeling like training is taking a toll on you, these images should remind you to keep working as hard as you can!"

Honours

As a Coach
VK Partizan
 National Championship of Serbia (4): 2001–02, 2006–07, 2007–08, 2008–09
 National Cup of Serbia (4): 2001–02, 2006–07, 2007–08, 2008–09

Individual
 OCS Coach of the Year Award (1): 2009

Public Engagements
In 2011, Udovičić - with his fellow countrymen Vlade Divac and Slobodan Soro - appeared in a TV commercial for a Quit smoking'' campaign.

References

External links
 

1970 births
Living people
Sportspeople from Belgrade
Serbian male water polo players
Serbian water polo coaches
Serbia men's national water polo team coaches
Water polo coaches at the 2008 Summer Olympics
Water polo coaches at the 2012 Summer Olympics
United States men's national water polo team coaches
Water polo coaches at the 2016 Summer Olympics
Water polo coaches at the 2020 Summer Olympics